Terrelonge is a Jamaican surname.

List of people with the surname 

 Alando Terrelonge, Jamaican politician and government minister
 Clive Terrelonge (born 1969), Jamaican former track and field athlete and coach

See also 

 Telonge, Haitian village

Surnames of North American origin